Tamási is a town in Tolna County, Hungary.

Tamási, named after St. Thomas, with a population of approximately 9200 is located just 30 kilometers East of Lake Balaton. The town was founded during Roman times and the Catholic church in the town center is built on the ruins of the Roman founded temple. During the 1525-1665 period the area was occupied by the invading Turks. This mainly agricultural town has the ruins of a castle torn mostly down after the 1848-1849 revolution by the conquering Austrians. There is a look-out tower on the top of the "Varhegy"- castle hill next to the thermal bath and the town, the  vineyards and their wine cellars can be see well from this point. The Soviet Army controlled the town from 1945-1989 until the Soviet eastern bloc fell. Since that time the country and the area have been governed by a Western style parliamentary democracy. Hungary is a member of both NATO and the European Union.

The main tourist attraction of Tamási is the spa and open-air bath. It is one of the well attended country spas of Hungary. The excellent natural environment, the health-providing quality of the water and the superb surrounding has made Tamási a known internationally attended curing spa. The thermal water is 52 Celsius warm and very healthy. The special health-improving quality of the water is due to its high sodium, calcium and potassium concentration. The 7 hectare wood-land of the bath is open all year round, where open-air pools, stretched-surfaced water-pools, separate children's pool are located. 6 km long cycle path connects Tamási and a small village (Pári) and crosses the wonderful landscape.

Most renowned among the natural beauties of the area is the Gyulaj Forest wild animal preserve, formerly owned by the famous Estherházy family for hunting. During the Communist period of 1945-1989 party officials from Budapest came down in organized large hunting parties and held great eating and drinking feasts after the hunt photos of which can be seen in the host lodge. On its territory of 7.8 hectares (oak and elm varieties), lives one of the world's largest population of fallow deer called dám vad. Water-birds (ferruginous duck, Nyroca n.nyroca, herons Egretta) and predatory birds (hawks, Accipiter sp., bald eagle, Heliaeetus leucocephalus) are seen at the nearby Pacsmag lake area. Bird watching camps are organised here, guided by specialised ornithologists.

Notable current and former residents 
 Andrea Osvárt, Hungarian actress
 Ernie Konnyu, retired American Congressman and California State Assemblyman of San Jose, CA USA was born here in 1937.

Twin towns - sister cities 

  Montigny-en-Gohelle
  Wurzen
  Isernhagen
  Suchy Las
  Volgodonsk
  Pyiterfolvo

References

External links

  in Hungarian, English and German
 Street map 
 Tamasi 20 minute video 

Populated places in Tolna County